The 1956 Cal Aggies football team represented the College of Agriculture at Davis—now known as the University of California, Davis—as a member of the Far Western Conference (FWC) during the 1956 NCAA College Division football season. Led by Will Lotter, who for returned for his second season as head coach and helming the team in 1954, the Aggies compiled an overall record of 7–3 with a mark of 4–1 in conference play, sharing the FWC title with Humboldt State and San Francisco State. The team outscored its opponents 146 to 78 for the season. The Cal Aggies played home games at Aggie Field in Davis, California.

Schedule

Notes

References

Cal Aggies
UC Davis Aggies football seasons
Northern California Athletic Conference football champion seasons
Cal Aggies football